Gunnebo Belgium is a member of the Gunnebo Security Group. The Gunnebo Security Group (OMX: GUNN) is a multinational corporation headquartered in Gothenburg, Sweden specialising in security solutions mainly in the areas of cash handling, physical security, electronic security and entrance control.

Gunnebro has operations in 33 countries with approximately 5800 employees (December 2012) and a reported global revenue of €585 million for 2011.

Gunnebo has been listed on the Stockholm Stock Exchange in Sweden since 1993 and can be found on the NASDAQ OMX Nordic Exchange Stockholm in the Mid Cap Industrials segment.

History 

Gunnebo has its roots in the village of Gunnebo in south-east Sweden, where Hans Hultman created a forge in 1764. Over the years this grew into a manufacturing business making nails and chains which later became Gunnebo Engineering.

Gunnebo AB (aktiebolag) was founded in 1995 when investment company HIDEF Capital AB changed its name to Gunnebo AB after having acquired Gunnebo Engineering. At this point the company chose to focus on security and began a series of major acquisitions (see below).

In 2005, Gunnebo Engineering was split off from Gunnebo AB.

Products

Cash Handling 

In the US and Eurozone, 80% of transactions are still made using cash. Cash handling products provide security for those parties involved in the cash handling chain. Typically these include central banks, retail banks, retailers and cash-in-transit (CIT) companies.

Cash handling encompasses products for cash transfer, cash deposit, cash recycling, coin roll dispensing and the management of cash handling processes.

Physical Security 
Physical security products include safes, safe deposit lockers and strongrooms. To determine the level of security provided by a safe or vault, there is a grading system from I-XII. A grade is always awarded by an independent body (European Certification Body). Safes with grades up to III are typically used by retailers or in offices, whereas banks tend to use safes and vaults with much higher grades.

Safes can also be constructed to withstand fire and therefore can also carry a fire protection grade. This denotes the type of contents which can be protected (either paper or data media) and the duration of protection (half an hour, one hour or two hours).

Gunnebo markets its physical security products under three different brands.

Electronic Security 
Electronic security covers CCTV and remote surveillance systems, access control systems, such as smart card readers or fingerprint readers, and electronic locking systems. It also typically includes the integration of such systems with one another.

Entrance Control 
Entrance control products include doors, turnstiles and other entrance systems which only allow entry to authorised individuals. These are used, for example, in mass transit public transport systems or at stadia to allow passage to only those people carrying a valid ticket. Entrance control is also used in airports to facilitate boarding and immigration control, and to prevent passengers returning from landside to airside.

Document References

Manufacturing companies of Belgium